The Florida Film Critics Circle Award for Best Actress is an award given by the Florida Film Critics Circle to honor the finest female lead acting achievements in film-making.

Winners
 * = Winner of the Academy Award for Best Actress

1990s

2000s

2010s

2020s

Superlatives
Cate Blanchett, Frances McDormand and Hilary Swank are the only three actresses who had won this award multiple times.

Florida Film Critics Circle Awards
Film awards for lead actor